The Kathmandu Valley Preservation Trust (KVPT) is an independent organization working to safeguard the historic architecture of the Kathmandu Valley in Nepal. KVPT was founded in 1991 by architectural historian Eduard Sekler, then team leader of the UNESCO Campaign to Safeguard the Cultural Heritage of the Kathmandu Valley, and is run by a team of Nepali architects and craftspeople in Patan, working closely with the Government of Nepal, Department of Archaeology. Over the past two decades, KVPT has saved over 50 buildings throughout the valley including rest-houses, temples, monasteries, stepwells, palaces and homes. Seismic retrofit is an important component of almost every restoration project. Since 2006, KVPT has been working primarily on the complete restoration and adaptive re-use of the abandoned palace complex adjoining Patan Durbar Square.

External links 
 Official website

Organisations based in Kathmandu
Architectural conservation
Environmental organisations based in Nepal
Architecture in Nepal
1991 establishments in Nepal